Les Oreilles  is a 2008 film.

Synopsis 
A boy by the name of Dieudonné (God Given) lives in a popular neighborhood in Yaoundé. His mother, a prostitute, does not love him. In view of this lack of affection, he decides to search for his father and observes every man he spots to see if he scratches his ear the way he himself does.

Awards 
 Festival Lumières d’Afrique de Besançon (Francia) 2009

References 

2008 films
Cameroonian short films
French drama short films
Cameroonian drama films
2000s French films